William A. Wilcox (active 1910s–1925) was an English footballer who played as a forward in the Football League for Crewe Alexandra. He also played non-league football in the Manchester and Cheshire area for clubs including Hurst, Macclesfield, for which he was top scorer in 1921–22 despite leaving the club in mid-season, Congleton Town and Chester.

During the First World War, Wilcox served with the Royal Flying Corps and played football for Manchester United and Chorley in the wartime competitions.

References

Year of birth missing
Year of death missing
Footballers from Manchester
English footballers
Association football forwards
Ashton United F.C. players
Macclesfield Town F.C. players
Congleton Town F.C. players
Crewe Alexandra F.C. players
Chester City F.C. players
English Football League players